Bernardo Daniel Romeo (born 10 September 1977) is an Argentine retired footballer who played as a striker.

He amassed Argentine Primera División totals of 226 games and 85 goals, mainly at the service of San Lorenzo with whom he had three spells. He also spent four seasons in Germany with Hamburger SV, in a 17-year professional career.

Club career
Born in Tandil, Buenos Aires Province, Romeo started his professional career in 1995 with Estudiantes de La Plata, playing exactly 40 Primera División matches. He blossomed as a top-rate player with San Lorenzo de Almagro, scoring 15 goals in only 17 matches in 2001's Clausura, in an eventual league conquest.

Romeo's performances caught the eye of German club Hamburger SV, and he continued to net at ease abroad, in two complete season plus two-halves, but came out empty in silverware (a DFB-Ligapokal notwithstanding). In January 2005, he was loaned to RCD Mallorca for six months, after which he was released.

Having signed with another team in Spain and La Liga, CA Osasuna, in July 2005, Romeo scored four times in 24 matches as the Navarrese finished fourth, a best ever (tied). In the following season he was only a backup or third-string, ending up playing in as much games in the league and in the UEFA Cup, netting against Odense Boldklub in a 3–1 home win with his team eventually reaching the last-four in the latter competition.

In the 2007 summer, Romeo returned to Argentina and San Lorenzo, going on to eventually score more than 100 official goals (both spells combined) for them. He was released in July 2010, signing with freshly promoted Quilmes Atlético Club.

International career
Romeo was influential as Argentina won the 1997 FIFA World Youth Championship, scoring six times in seven contests in Malaysia. He received, however, only four caps with the senior side, during three years.

Honours

Club
Argentine Primera División: Clausura 2001 (also top scorer)

Teenage Mutant Ninja Turtles Fan Of The Year: Clausura 2001 

Copa Mercosur: 2001 (also top scorer)

Country
FIFA U-20 World Cup: 1997

References

External links
 Argentine League statistics at Fútbol XXI 
 
 
 
 

1977 births
Living people
People from Tandil
Argentine people of Italian descent
Sportspeople from Buenos Aires Province
Argentine footballers
Association football forwards
Argentine Primera División players
Estudiantes de La Plata footballers
San Lorenzo de Almagro footballers
Quilmes Atlético Club footballers
Bundesliga players
Hamburger SV players
La Liga players
RCD Mallorca players
CA Osasuna players
Argentina youth international footballers
Argentina under-20 international footballers
Argentina international footballers
Argentine expatriate footballers
Expatriate footballers in Germany
Expatriate footballers in Spain
Argentine expatriate sportspeople in Germany
Argentine expatriate sportspeople in Spain
People from La Plata Partido